Sara Rún Hinriksdóttir (born 14 August 1996) is an Icelandic basketball player who currently plays for Faenza Basket Project of the Italian Lega Basket Femminile and the Icelandic national basketball team. She played college basketball for Canisius in the Metro Atlantic Athletic Conference. She was named the Icelandic Female Basketball Player of the Year in 2020, 2021 and 2022.

Playing career

Early years
Born in Reykjavík, Sara started her senior career with Keflavík in 2011. She was named to the Úrvalsdeild All-first team for the first half of the 2012-2013 season, at the age of 16, after averaging 15 points and 9 rebounds in the first fourteen games. In 2013, she helped Keflavík win both the Icelandic Basketball Cup and the national championship.

During the 2014-2015 season, Sara helped Keflavík to the second best record in the league and was named to the Úrvalsdeild All-first team for the second half of the season. Keflavík swept Haukar in the semi-finals in the playoffs and met defending champions Snæfell in the finals. On April 28, she became the second youngest player to score 30 or more points in a Finals game when she scored 31 points in a losing effort against Snæfell in the third and final game of the series. For the playoffs, Sara averaged 18.8 points og 7.5 rebounds.

Move to college
After the finals, Sara joined Canisius College. On 30 November 2015 she was named the MAAC Rookie of the Week.

On 22 January 2018, Sara was named the MAAC player of the week for the second time in her career after averaging 23 points and 7.5 rebounds in the Golden Griffins two victories during the week.

On 24 February 2018, she scored her 1,000 college career point in a game against Siena College.

On 11 December 2018, she was named the MAAC player of the week after averaging 17.0 points and 12.2 rebounds during the week. On 25 February 2019, she was again named the MAAC player of the week after she averaged 21.0 points, 8.5 rebounds and 4.0 assists.

Canisius statistics

Source

Return to Keflavík
On 21 February 2019, Keflavík announced that Sara would join the team in March after concluding her season with Canisius. She helped Keflavík to the Úrvalsdeild finals where they lost to Valur. In 11 regular season and playoffs games, Sara averaged 16.7 points, 7.1 rebounds and 3.3 assists per game.

Leicester Riders
In September 2019, Sara signed with Leicester Riders of the Women's British Basketball League while also studying for her Master's degree at Loughborough University.

On 15 March 2020, Sara was named MVP after leading the Riders to their third straight WBBL Trophy with a 70-66 victory against Durham Palatinates.

On 20 December 2020, Sara was named the Icelandic Female Basketball Player of the Year.

On 12 February 2021, Sara helped the riders to win the WBBL Cup for the first time.

Haukar
On 25 February 2021, Sara Rún returned to Iceland and signed with Haukar, rejoining with her twin sister Bríet Sif. On 10 March 2021, the sisters combined to score 62 points and make 12 three pointers in a 120-77 victory against KR. Following the season, she was named the Úrvalsdeild Domestic Player of the Year after leading Haukar to the Úrvalsdeild finals.

Phoenix Constanța
In August 2021, Sara Rún signed with CS Phoenix Constanța of the Romanian Liga Națională.

On 16 December 2021, it was announced that she had been named the Icelandic Female Basketball Player of the Year for the second year in a row.

Faenza Basket Project
In June 2022, Sara signed with Faenza Basket Project of the Italian Lega Basket Femminile. In December 2022, she was named the Icelandic Female Basketball Player of the Year for the third straight year.

Icelandic national team
Sara played her first game for the Icelandic national basketball team in 2013 On 14 November 2020, she became the third player to break the 30 point barrier for the national team when she scored 31 points in a loss against Bulgaria in the EuroBasket Women 2021 qualification. On 27 November 2022, she scored 33 points in victory against Romania.

Personal life
Sara's twin sister, Bríet Sif Hinriksdóttir, is a basketball player in the Úrvalsdeild kvenna and a member of the Icelandic national team.

Awards, titles and accomplishments

Individual awards
Icelandic Female Basketball Player of the Year (3): 2020, 2021, 2022
Úrvalsdeild Domestic Player of the Year: 2021
Úrvalsdeild Domestic All-First Team (2): 2015, 2021
Úrvalsdeild Young Player of the Year (2): 2013, 2015
WBBL Trophy MVP: 2020

Titles
Icelandic champion: 2013
Icelandic Basketball Cup: 2013
Icelandic Supercup: 2013
Icelandic Company Cup: 2014
WBBL Trophy: 2020
WBBL Cup: 2021

References

External links
Icelandic statistics at kki.is
WBBL statistics
College profile at gogriffs.com

1996 births
Living people
Canisius Golden Griffins women's basketball players
Forwards (basketball)
Sara Run Hinriksdottir
Sara Run Hinriksdottir
Sara Run Hinriksdottir
Sara Run Hinriksdottir
Sara Run Hinriksdottir
Sara Run Hinriksdottir
Sara Run Hinriksdottir
Leicester Riders players
Sara Run Hinriksdottir